Highway 45 is a highway in the Canadian province of Saskatchewan. It runs from Highway 42 at Lucky Lake to Highway 7 near Delisle.

Highway 45 passes near Lucky Lake, Tullis, Birsay, Lyons, Macrorie, Swanson, Donavon, and Delisle.

Major intersections
From south to north:

References

045